Harriet B. Presser (1936–2012) was a sociologist and demographer. Having served on the faculty at the University of Maryland, College Park, for more than 30 years, at the time of her death she was a Distinguished University Professor. She was elected president of the Population Association of America for the year 1989. In addition, she was awarded the Jessie Bernard Award from the American Sociological Association in 2010, and was elected as a Fellow to the American Association for the Advancement of Science in 2002. As a scholar, she studied the intersection of gender, work and family, and pioneered the sociological specialization in that area. She was widely recognized for bringing a feminist perspective to the demographic study of such issues as fertility, child care, housework, and the effects of the global 24/7 service economy.

In 2009, the International Union for the Scientific Study of Population held a special session in her honor, titled "Cross-Cultural Challenges to Research on Gender and Population", at its 26th International Population Conference in Marrakesh.

Research contributions

In 1969, Presser reported on the unprecedented levels of female sterilization on the island of Puerto Rico. According to her 1965 data, 34% of mothers ages 20–49 had been sterilized, resulting in a rapid drop in the island's fertility rate. The Puerto Rican case eventually was exposed as one of the most egregious cases of compulsory sterilization policies.

In the 1970s, she published extensively on the timing of fertility and its consequences for women's adult lives. The research helped establish the critical importance of the timing of first births and whether they were planned.

In the 1980s Presser studied the challenges of child care, its affordability and availability. In particular, she pointed out that as women entered the labor force at higher rates, child care posed problems both for families and for the organization of the workplace. This was the subject of her presidential address to the Population Association of America, "Can We Make Time for Children?"

In 1983, in the journal Science, Presser and Virginia Cain reported that one-third of dual-earner families with children had a spouse working outside of "regular" working hours. In a subsequent study, Presser found that husbands were more likely to do housework if they were home when their wives were working. That was early evidence of how families with children juggled time demands when both spouses were working, and highlighted the inadequacy of available, affordable child care options.

Over the course of her research on work-family intersections, Presser played an instrumental role in establishing the need for better data collection regarding both child care arrangements and the timing of work hours (rather than simply their quantity). While much of the research on economic transformations in the late 20th century focused on globalization and changes in manufacturing, Presser's work showed that it was local pressures—especially the demands of the 24-hour service economy and the lack of child care options—that often drove families into hard choices. This line of research culminated in her 2003 book, Working in a 24/7 Economy: Challenges for American Families, published by the Russell Sage Foundation, which supported the work.

When Working in a 24/7 Economy was published, it was featured in news reports about the family stress and health impacts of long and irregular work hours, published in the New York Times, the Christian Science Monitor, and USA Today. Publications that reviewed the book include Science and the American Journal of Sociology.

Selected bibliography

Books

Journal articles

Harriet B. Presser Award

In 2009, the Population Association of America established the Harriet B. Presser Award, given biennially for career contributions to the study of gender and demography. The recipients of the award have been:
 2009: Valerie Kincaid Oppenheimer
 2011: Karen Oppenheim Mason
 2013: Ruth Dixon-Mueller
 2015: Paula England
 2017: Frances Goldscheider
 2019: Jennifer Glass

References

1936 births
2012 deaths
American sociologists
American women sociologists
Family sociologists
American demographers
University of Maryland, College Park faculty
Columbian College of Arts and Sciences alumni
University of North Carolina at Chapel Hill alumni
University of California, Berkeley alumni
Fellows of the American Association for the Advancement of Science